Peter Latham may refer to:

Peter Latham (tennis) (1865–1953), British racquets and real tennis player
Peter Latham (cyclist) (born 1984), New Zealand racing cyclist
Peter Latham (RAF officer) (1925–2016), British senior air force officer